Modlinek may refer to the following places:
Modlinek, Pomeranian Voivodeship, Poland
Modlinek, Masovian Voivodeship, Poland